Grim Reapers Motorcycle Club may refer to:

Grim Reapers Motorcycle Club (Canada), an outlaw motorcycle club established in Alberta (1967), patched over to the Hells Angels in 1997
Grim Reapers Motorcycle Club (USA), an outlaw motorcycle club established in Kentucky (1965)